Ahoramai is a village in Jagat Tehsil, Budaun district, Uttar Pradesh, India. The Budaun railway station is located at the distance of 8 kilometer from the village. Its village code is 128367. As per the report of 2011 Census of India, The total population of the village is 1334, where 720 are males and 614 are females. The village is administrated by Gram Panchayat.

References

Villages in Budaun district